Krasnogorsky is a rural locality (a khutor) in Araslanovsky Selsoviet, Meleuzovsky District, Bashkortostan, Russia. The population was 96 as of 2010. There are 2 streets.

Geography 
Krasnogorsky is located 24 km north of Meleuz (the district's administrative centre) by road. Vasilyevka is the nearest rural locality.

References 

Rural localities in Meleuzovsky District